Schistophila is a genus of moths in the family Gelechiidae.

Species
Schistophila fuscella Forbes, 1931
Schistophila laurocistella Chrétien, 1899

References

Litini
Moth genera